The Lost Soldier may refer to:

 The Chinese Widow, a 2018 film released in France under the title The Lost Soldier
 Texas Rising: The Lost Soldier, a 2015 miniseries with Christopher Sommers

See also
 Lost Soldier, racehorse who won the 1995 and 1996 Godolphin Mile
 For a Lost Soldier, a 1992 Dutch film